Fengbo Station is a station on and the eastern terminus of Line 15 of the Beijing Subway.

Station layout 
The station has an underground island platform.

Exits 
There are four exits, lettered A, B, C1, and C2. Exit C2 is accessible.

References

External links 

Beijing Subway stations in Shunyi District